Members of the New South Wales Legislative Council who served in the 51st Parliament were  affected by the 1991 referendum. The Council consisted of 42 members, 6 elected in 1988, 15 elected in 1991 and 21 elected in 1995. As members serve eight-year terms, half of the Council did not face re-election in 1995, and the members elected in 1995 did not face re-election until 2003. The President was Max Willis until 29 June 1998 and then Virginia Chadwick.

References

Members of New South Wales parliaments by term
20th-century Australian politicians